Herc may refer to:

People
Christián Herc (born 1998), Slovak footballer
DJ Kool Herc (born 1955), Jamaican-born DJ credited with originating hip hop music
Ernest Alley (c. 1904 – 1971), American college football player and head coach and track athlete and head coach
Herc McIntyre, head of Universal Pictures in Australia from 1920 until the 1950s
Hercules Herc Vollugi (1880–1960), Australian rules footballer

Entertainment
Herc, a fictional character on the HBO drama series The Wire
Herc (Hercules), the title character of the 1998 animated Disney TV series Hercules
Dr. Herman "Herc" Armstrong, a character in the 1986 animated series Inhumanoids
Hercules "Herc" Hansen, a character in the film Pacific Rim
Captain Hercules "Herc" Shipwright, a recurring character in the British radio series Cabin Pressure
Herc Stormsailor, a main character in the French/North American animated TV show Jayce and the Wheeled Warriors
a playable character in Herc's Adventures, a video game released in 1997
Humaniform-Emulation Roboticized Combat Unit with Leg-Articulated Navigation (HERC for short), a war machine in the video game Metaltech: Earthsiege and its sequels

Other uses
Hertz Equipment Rental Corporation, a heavy equipment rental division of the Hertz Corporation from 1965 to 2016
Higher Education Recruitment Consortium
Helicopter Engineering Research Corporation, predecessor of Jovair, founded in 1946
Trenton Hercs, later name of the now defunct Trenton Sting Canadian Junior "A" ice hockey team in the 2008–2009 season
Radio Herc, a local radio station in Kosovo - see List of radio stations in Kosovo
HERC1, HERC2, HERC3, HERC4, HERC5, HERC6, human enzymes and the genes that encode them

See also
 Hercules (disambiguation), many frequently abbreviated as "Herc"

pl:Herc